Evan Kuhlman is an American author of children's novels. Prior to becoming a full-time writer, Kuhlman attended the University of Notre Dame and worked as a restaurant manager and a reporter. Kuhlman has written for various publications such as Glimmer Train and the Notre Dame Review.

Bibliography

Books
Wolf Boy (2006) 
The Last Invisible Boy (2008)
Brother From a Box (2012)
Great Ball of light (2015)

Plays
The Bread Man

Awards
Short-Story Award for New Writers
Deutscher Jugendliteraturpreis for Kinderbuch (2011, nomination)

References

American fiction writers
American male writers
University of Notre Dame alumni
Living people
Year of birth missing (living people)
American children's writers